Framed is a 1940 American crime film directed by Harold D. Schuster and written by Roy Chanslor. The film stars Frank Albertson, Constance Moore, Jerome Cowan, Robert Armstrong, Sidney Blackmer, Judith Allen and Herbert Rawlinson. The film was released on February 23, 1940, by Universal Pictures.

Plot

Cast        
Frank Albertson as Henry T. Parker
Constance Moore as Phyllis Sanderson
Jerome Cowan as Monty de Granville
Robert Armstrong as Skippy
Sidney Blackmer as Tony Bowman
Judith Allen as Gwen Porter
Herbert Rawlinson as Walter Billings
Vinton Hayworth as Nick 
Milburn Stone as Mathew Mattison 
Barbara Pepper as Goldie Green

References

External links
 
 

1940 films
1940s English-language films
American crime films
1940 crime films
Universal Pictures films
Films directed by Harold D. Schuster
American black-and-white films
1940s American films